Paul Robert Ysebaert (born May 15, 1966) is a Canadian former professional ice hockey player.  During his fourteen years playing career, he played 11 years in the National Hockey League as a left wing for the New Jersey Devils, Detroit Red Wings, Winnipeg Jets, Chicago Blackhawks, and Tampa Bay Lightning.  Ysebaert accumulated a total of 336 points in 532 games during his career.

Playing career

Ysebaert was one of the more popular players in Detroit during the early 1990s after arriving in a trade from the New Jersey Devils.  Earning the nickname "Rocket Man" from the fans, he enjoyed his best season in 1991–92, with 35 goals and 40 assists.  The same year he became the first Red Wing to win the NHL Plus-Minus Award.  Ysebaert was dealt to the Winnipeg Jets before the 1993–94 season for former University of Michigan defenceman Aaron Ward.  Ysebaert served as the first captain of the Tampa Bay Lightning, from 1995 to 1997. After one season in Europe, Ysebaert retired in 2000, citing injuries.

Career statistics

Awards and honours

References

External links

Paul Ysebaert at hockeydraftcentral.com

1966 births
Living people
New Jersey Devils draft picks
Bowling Green Falcons men's ice hockey players
Canadian ice hockey left wingers
Chicago Blackhawks players
Cleveland Lumberjacks players
Detroit Red Wings players
Ice hockey people from Ontario
New Jersey Devils players
Sportspeople from Sarnia
Tampa Bay Lightning players
Utica Devils players
Winnipeg Jets (1979–1996) players